was a politician and cabinet minister in the pre-war Empire of Japan.

Biography
Hayashi Yūzō was a native of Tosa Province (modern-day Kōchi Prefecture), where his father, Iwamura Hidetoshi, was a samurai in the service of Tosa Domain. His elder brother was Iwamura Michitoshi and his younger brother was Iwamura Takatoshi, both of whom served in numerous posts within the Meiji government. He was adopted into the Hayashi family at an early age. During the Boshin War, he fought against the forces of the Tokugawa shogunate in Echigo Province.

Following the Meiji Restoration, Hayashi joined the new Meiji government. He was sent on a mission to Europe in August 1870 to monitor the Franco-Prussian War, and arrived in Berlin in October together with Ōyama Iwao, Shinagawa Yajirō, and Arichi Shinanojō. After his return to Japan in May 1871, he worked with Itagaki Taisuke but resigned in 1873 due to his disagreement with government policy in the Seikanron debate. He returned to Kōchi but was later arrested for supplying arms in support of Saigō Takamori in the Satsuma Rebellion. One of the leading advocates of the rebellion, Hayashi also planned to seize a Mitsubishi steamer and attack the government arsenal at Osaka. For these actions, he was sentenced to ten years in prison.

Following his release from prison in 1886, Hayashi rejoined Itagaki Taisuke and became a member of the Jiyūtō political party. He was temporarily expelled from Tokyo under the Safety Preservation Law of 1887 for his continued opposition to government policies. He won a seat in the Lower House of the Diet of Japan in the 1890 General Election, and was subsequently reelected eight times to the same seat.

In the 1st Ōkuma Shigenobu administration in 1898, Hayashi was appointed Minister of Communications. He rejoined the cabinet again in 1900 under the 4th Itō Hirobumi administration as Minister of Agriculture and Commerce and assisted in the formation of the Rikken Seiyūkai political party. Hayashi retired from public life in 1908.

Returning to his native Kōchi Prefecture, Hayashi became an entrepreneur, forming a company to make cultured pearls. He died in 1921 at age 80 and his grave is located in the city of Sukumo, Kōchi.

References

Notes

 
 

1842 births
1921 deaths
Samurai
People from Kōchi Prefecture
Government ministers of Japan
People of Meiji-period Japan
Members of the House of Representatives (Empire of Japan)
People of the Boshin War
Liberal Party (Japan, 1881) politicians